The States of the Weimar Republic were the first-level administrative divisions and constituent states of the German Reich during the Weimar Republic era. The states were established in 1918 following the German Revolution upon the conclusion of World War I, and based on the 22 constituent states of the German Empire that abolished their local monarchies. The new states continued as republics alongside the three pre-existing city-states within the new Weimar Republic, adopting the titles Freistaat ("Free State") or Volksstaat ("People's State").

Weimar Republic states
Germany suffered significant territorial losses from the Treaty of Versailles following World War I, and some states had their borders altered by international border changes.  In 1920, the state of Thuringia was formed from the former Ernestine duchies that continued briefly as republics before merging, except for Saxe-Coburg, which became part of Bavaria. Additionally, the Saar Basin and the city of Danzig were detached from Germany and placed in the care of the League of Nations.

States under Nazi Germany

The states of the Weimar Republic were effectively abolished after the establishment of Nazi Germany in 1933 by a series of decrees between 1933 and 1935, and autonomy was replaced by direct rule of the National Socialist German Workers' Party in the Gleichschaltung process. The states continued to formally exist as de jure rudimentary bodies, but from 1934 were superseded by de facto Nazi provinces called Gaue. Many of the states were formally dissolved at the end of World War II by the Allies, and ultimately re-organised into the modern states of Germany.

During the Third Reich, the Nazis created the office of Reichsstatthalter (Reich Governor) to gain direct control over all states other than Prussia after winning the general elections of 1933. Their independent state governments and parliaments were successively abolished, and the Reich government took over direct control in a process called Gleichschaltung ("coordination"). Prussia's government had already been taken over by the Reich a year earlier in the Preußenschlag under Chancellor Franz von Papen.

Two weeks after the passage of the Enabling Act of 1933, which effectively made Adolf Hitler the dictator of Germany, the Nazi government issued the "Second Law on the Coordination of the States with the Reich" (Zweites Gesetz zur Gleichschaltung der Länder mit dem Reich) on 7 April 1933. This law deployed one Reich Governor in each state. The Reich Governors were given the task of overseeing the fulfillment of Hitler's political guidelines in the states. Indeed, the law required them to carry out "the general policy of the Chancellor." In practice, they acted as proconsuls with complete authority over the state governments. 

In Prussia, the largest of the German states, Hitler took direct control by appointing himself as Reichstatthalter. However, he passed his authority to Hermann Göring, who had been installed as Prussian prime minister without an election. The Prussian provinces were administered by an Oberpräsident, usually the local Gauleiter.

The Law on the Reconstruction of the Reich (Gesetz über den Neuaufbau des Reichs), passed on 30 January 1934, formally de-federalized the Reich for the first time in its history. However, Germany had effectively become a highly centralized state with the passage of the Enabling Act and the posting of the Reich Governors. The states' powers were transferred to the Reich, and their parliaments were abolished. The Reich Governors were made responsible to the Reich Minister of the Interior, Wilhelm Frick. For all intents and purposes, the states were reduced to provinces.

The Reich Governors Law (Reichsstatthaltergesetz) of 30 January 1935 formally designated the Reich Governors as the representatives of the Reich government, appointed to watch over the execution of the political guidelines issued by the Führer und Reichskanzler (Hitler). They received the authority to "inform" the provincial authorities about the guidelines and the measures to fulfill them. The Reichsstatthalter were now also empowered to take over all functions of state government, and also appointed the mayors of all towns and cities with populations fewer than 100,000. This had the effect of giving the Reich Interior Ministry near-complete control over local government. The Interior Minister appointed the mayors of all cities with populations greater than 100,000 (though Hitler reserved the right to appoint the mayors of Berlin and Hamburg himself if he deemed it necessary), and as mentioned above the Reich Governors were responsible to him.

Annexed territories

After the Anschluss ("union") with Germany, Austria, renamed Ostmark, became the first of a new type of administrative subdivision called a Reichsgau (not to be confused with Nazi Party Gaue).  Austria's last pre-war chancellor Arthur Seyss-Inquart became its first Reichsstatthalter.  However, with the promulgation of the Ostmarkgesetz on 1 May 1939, the former States of Austria were reorganized into seven new Reichsgaue, each under the rule of a government official holding the dual offices of Reichsstatthalter (governor) and Gauleiter (Nazi Party leader).  Generally, these positions were occupied by the last state premier.

The names of these new Reichsgaue were sometimes different and there were some differences in borders.  The former states of Burgenland and Vorarlberg were dissolved.  The Reichsgaue were as follows:
Carinthia, including East Tyrol; increased by Slovenian Carinthia and Upper Carniola as occupied territories after the 1941 Balkans Campaign
Lower Danube (Niederdonau), the new name for Lower Austria, with its capital at Krems an der Donau, including the northern districts of Burgenland with Eisenstadt and the South Moravian territories around Znojmo (Deutsch-Südmähren) annexed with the "Sudetenland" according to the 1938 Munich Agreement.
Salzburg
Styria, including the southern districts of Burgenland; increased by Lower Styria as occupied territory after the 1941 Balkans Campaign
Upper Danube (Oberdonau), the new name for Upper Austria, including the Styrian Aussee region (Ausseerland) and the South Bohemian territories around Český Krumlov annexed with the "Sudetenland" according to the 1938 Munich Agreement
Tyrol, i.e. North Tyrol, plus the administrative district of Vorarlberg
Vienna, i.e. "Greater Vienna", including several surrounding Lower Austrian municipalities incorporated in 1938.

Subsequently, additional Reichsgaue were added as Germany invaded more European territories before and during World War II.  These included:
Sudetenland (1939)
Danzig-West Prussia (1939)
Flanders (1944)
Wallonia (1944)

List of states

Free States

Free and Hanseatic Cities

Other territories
After World War I, the Saar Basin was occupied and governed jointly by the United Kingdom and France from 1920 to 1935 under a League of Nations mandate. After a plebiscite was held in January 1935, the region was returned to Germany.

In accordance with the Treaty of Versailles, the city of Danzig (now Gdańsk, Poland) was detached from Germany on 15 November 1920 and turned into a semi-autonomous city-state under the protection of the League of Nations. The Treaty stated that it was to remain separate from both Germany and the newly independent Poland, but was not its own sovereign state. After the Nazis invaded Poland in September 1939, the city's autonomous status was revoked and it was annexed by Germany.

See also
Provinces of Prussia
States of the German Confederation
States of the German Empire
Administrative divisions of Nazi Germany
Administrative divisions of East Germany
States of Germany

References

 
Weimar Germany
Weimar